Kaal Bhairav is a Hindu shrine located in Kathmandu Durbar Square, a UNESCO World Heritage Site. According to legend, the shrine was found at a paddy field and later it was placed at the Durbar Square by King Pratap Malla. Kaal Bhairav is believed to have been sculptured from a single stone.

References

External links
 

Kathmandu District
Kathmandu Durbar Square
World Heritage Sites in Nepal
Hindu temples in Kathmandu District
17th-century establishments in Nepal